Guhyeong of Geumgwan Gaya, also often Guhae (r. 521–532) was the tenth and final ruler of Geumgwan Gaya, a Gaya state of ancient Korea.  He was the son of King Gyeomji and Queen Suk.

Faced with an onslaught of Silla forces under King Beopheung, King Guhyeong chose to surrender freely, and brought his family and his treasures to Silla.  He was received with ceremony and his family were admitted to the second-highest rank of the Silla bone rank system, the "true bone."  The king was given the rank of Sangdaedeung, and permitted to keep his former territory as sigeup stipend land.  According to the Samguk Yusa, this occurred either 520 or 490 years after the kingdom's legendary founding by King Suro.

Family
Father: King Gyeomji (겸지왕, 鉗知王)
Mother: Lady Suk (숙부인, 淑夫人)
Wife: Lady Gyehwa (계화부인, 桂花夫人) – daughter of a suijil named Bunjil (분질).
1st son: Gim Sejong (김세종, 金世宗) – father of Gim Solji (김솔지, 金率支).
2nd son: Gim Muryeok (김무력, 金武力) – father of Gim Seohyeon (김서현, 金舒玄).
3rd son: Gim Mudeuk (김무득, 金武得) – father of Gim Changhyeon (김창현, 金昌玄).

See also 
 List of Korean monarchs
 History of Korea
 Gaya confederacy
 Three Kingdoms of Korea

Notes

References 

Kim Bu-sik.  Silla Bon-gi, Samguk Sagi.

Gaya rulers
6th-century monarchs in Asia